Oak Run (also known as Whiteoak Run) is a tributary of Wolf Run in Lycoming County, Pennsylvania, in the United States. The stream is relatively small and flows through a narrow valley. A school district was in the valley in the early 1900s, but the school closed in 1948.

Course
Oak Run begins in a valley to the southeast of Long Hill in Muncy Township. It flows southwest through the valley for several tenths of a mile, receiving an unnamed tributary from the right and passing through a small pond. The stream then turns south-southwest for several tenths of a mile, passing through another small pond before turning south. A few tenths of a mile further downstream, it leaves its valley and turns south-southeast for several tenths of a mile. The stream then receives an unnamed tributary from the left and turns south-southwest for a few tenths of a mile before crossing US Route 220. It then continues south-southwest for a few tenths of a mile before reaching its confluence with Wolf Run.

Geography and geology

At its southeastern end, it enters the Muncy Valley. Oak Run itself is a small stream.

There are beds of the upper Mahantango Formation in the vicinity of Oak Run; these underlie the Tully Limestone. The upper Mahantango Formation beds in this area contain brown shale and white clayey shale. Sandstone of the Trimmers Rock Formation also occurs in the stream's vicinity.

Watershed, hydrology, and biology
The mouth of the stream is in the United States Geological Survey quadrangle of Muncy. However, its source is in the quadrangle of Huntersville. The mouth of the stream is located near Pennsdale.

In the late 1960s and/or early 1970s, Oak Run was "moderately depressed" due to concrete waste slug. Fishes in the stream were seriously impacted.

History
Oak Run was entered into the Geographic Names Information System on August 2, 1979. Its identifier in the Geographic Names Information System is 1182798. The stream is also known as Whiteoak Run. This variant name appears in Andrew Sherwood and Franklin Platt's The Geology of Lycoming County, which was published in 1880.

In 1912, the County Commissioners of Lycoming County completed plans for a concrete bridge over Oak Run. The Oak Run School District was historically located in the valley of Oak Run. In the early 1900s, the stream was lined with the houses of people who attended the school. An outbreak of diphtheria occurred in the Oak Run School District in 1914 and 1915. The school closed in 1948.

See also
List of rivers of Pennsylvania

References

Rivers of Lycoming County, Pennsylvania
Tributaries of Muncy Creek
Rivers of Pennsylvania